Schwartz Publishing is an Australian publishing house, digital media and news media organisation based in Carlton, Melbourne, Victoria established by Australian property developer Morry Schwartz in the 1980s. Since the late 1990s many of its publications have appeared under the Black Inc imprint. Schwartz Publishing has its complementary brand Schwartz Media, which all sit under the wider group of 'Schwartz' companies specialising in newspapers, books, essays, magazines, journals, podcasts and online news media.

History
In the 1980s Schwartz Publishing mainly published American self-help books. Its all-time bestseller was Life's Little Instruction Book by H. Jackson Brown Jr. with 300,000 copies sold. In the 1990s Schwartz Publishing set up the Black Inc imprint, publishing since 2001 the Quarterly Essay and since 2005 The Monthly. In 2017, Black Inc. Books alongside La Trobe University launched a joint publishing imprint, La Trobe University Press (LTUP).

The Monthly 
The Monthly launched in 2005. It is Australia’s foremost magazine on politics and culture. The Monthly has published key journalism on everything from the Gunns pulp mill in Tasmania to the death in custody of Cameron Doomadgee on Palm Island. Its contributor list includes Helen Garner, Richard Flanagan, David Marr, Don Watson, Chloe Hooper, Tim Winton, Christos Tsiolkas, Noel Pearson, Anne Manne, Robert Manne, Karen Hitchcock, Anwen Crawford, Anna Goldsworthy and J.M. Coetzee. In 2020, The Monthly had 100,000 print readership and 220,000 web and app readership. The current editor of The Monthly is Nick Feik.

The Saturday Paper 

In 2014, Schwartz Media began publishing The Saturday Paper, with the aim to "challenge orthodoxy...question authority and provoke debate." The newspaper was launched on 1 March 2014 in Sydney, Melbourne, and Canberra. The publication of The Saturday Paper came at a time when newspapers were experiencing major write-downs. Schwartz Media is one of the most trusted media sources in Australia, being the most trusted non-broadcast media outlets and placing 3rd in overall media outlets just behind SBS and ABC, by a Roy Morgan Media Net Trust Survey in April 2019. Schwartz Media was one of only four media outlets with a positive media trust rating. In the 12 months leading up to September 2019, The Saturday Paper's readership results were released, showing that new paper had successfully grown by 8.2% with now a circulation of 250,000, despite the overall news media industry declining by 3.7%.

According to data from Roy Morgan, The Saturday Paper nearly doubled its readership during the Covid-19 pandemic, with figures reported from March 2020, 119,000 growing to 224,000, March 2021. Schwartz Media’s flagship magazine, The Monthly, has reported a 40% increase in subscriptions since March 2020.

Podcasts and new media

7am 
In May 2019, Schwartz Media announced the launch of 7am, a daily new podcast. 7am is hosted by award-winning investigative journalist and documentary host Ruby Jones and with editor Osman Faruqi. Available every weekday morning, the podcast followed a global trend of increasing engagement, popularity and adoption of podcasting as a new medium of media, having increased by 700,000 active Australian listeners since 2015 (an increase of 70%).

In May 2020, 7am announced it would be partnering with Acast the world's largest podcast company for the distribution of its growing listener base, with it now being available on all the major podcasting platforms being Apple Podcasts, Spotify and Google Podcasts as well as other smaller platforms such as Acast, Castbox, Overcast, Pocket Casts, Podbean and Stitcher.

Following this announcement, Schwartz Media also celebrated a new audience listenership milestone, with an average of 45,000 Australian listens each day, or almost a quarter of a million listens weekly, placing it in the top five Australian podcasts. Schwartz Media has subsequently launched two more podcasts being The Saturday Quiz hosted by Australian actor John Leary and The AFA Podcast hosted by Jonathan Pearlman, the editor of the Australian Foreign Affairs Journal.

The Culture 
Building on the success of its flagship daily news podcast 7am, and its growing arts and culture coverage, Schwartz Media launched The Culture in May 2021. Award-winning journalist and editor of 7am Osman Faruqi is the host of The Culture. Episodes are released every Friday, taking a weekly deep dive into the latest in film, music, TV, streaming, books and art.

Editorial Appointments and Changes 

The CEO of Schwartz Media is Rebecca Costello, who has been in this role from September 2006. In June 2018, Erik Jensen, formerly editor of The Saturday Paper, became editor-in-chief of Schwartz Media and The Saturday Paper.  Charis Palmer was previously the CEO of Schwartz Pro, being in the role from its planning and pre-launch in June 2018 until her departure in early 2020. 

In March 2014, Nick Feik was appointed editor of The Monthly. 

Maddison Connaughton was appointed editor of The Saturday Paper in July 2018, a role she held until June 2021.

Pascall Prize-winning critic Alison Croggon was appointed arts editor of The Saturday Paper in August 2020.

In April 2021, Osman Faruqi was appointed inaugural head of audio at Schwartz Media, overseeing the growth of the company’s podcast offering. 

In June 2021, Erik Jensen returned to the role of editor of The Saturday Paper, a position he had previously held from 2014 - 2018.

Publications

Black Inc 
 Quarterly Essay
 Australian Foreign Affairs
 The La Trobe University Press

Schwartz Media 
 The Monthly
 The Saturday Paper
 7am (podcast)
 The Culture (podcast)
 The AFA Podcast (podcast)

Email Products

Post 
Post is a free email edited by journalist Max Opray which provides news updates on the top stories of the day, delivered to subscribers’ inboxes on weekday mornings. In 2021, Post had over 30,000 subscribers.

The Politics 
The Politics is a free daily column covering the day in politics, delivered to subscribers' inboxes on weekday afternoons. Contributing editor to The Monthly Rachel Withers is the current editor of The Politics. Award-winning journalist Paddy Manning was the previous editor. In 2021, The Monthly Today had over 20,000 subscribers.   

Schwartz Media publishes other free email products including The Saturday Briefing from The Saturday Paper, Sunday Reads from The Monthly, and Audiogram from 7am.

References

External links 

 Black Inc Books

Book publishing companies of Australia
Magazine publishing companies of Australia
Mass media in Melbourne
Podcasting companies